Michl Ebner (born 20 September 1952 in Bolzano, Italy) is an Italian politician and a former Member of the European Parliament for North-East with the Südtiroler Volkspartei, Member of the Bureau of the European People's Party.

During his term he sat on the European Parliament's Committee on Agriculture and Rural Development. He was also a substitute for the Committee on Foreign Affairs and a member of the Delegation to the EU-Croatia Joint Parliamentary Committee.

In September 2015 he was elected President of the Federation of Associations for Hunting and Conservation of the EU.

Career
 since 1972: Political work in the youth group of the SVP (Südtiroler Volkspartei)
 since 1979: Member of the SVP leadership

Education
 Member of the standing committee for questions concerning the Province of Bolzano
 1987-1994: Member of the Chamber of Deputies of Italy (1979–1994), member of the Committee on Public Works and the Environment (1979–1987), the Committee on Agriculture (1987–1994) and of the Bureau of the Chamber of Deputies
 since 1994: Member of the European Parliament
 since 2008 President of the Chamber of Commerce of Südtirol

See also
2004 European Parliament election in Italy

External links
 

1952 births
Living people
South Tyrolean People's Party MEPs
MEPs for Italy 2004–2009
MEPs for Italy 1999–2004
Politicians from Bolzano